Komet is the word for comet in some languages and may refer to:

In the military:
 Messerschmitt Me 163 Komet, the first rocket-powered crewed aircraft
 German auxiliary cruiser Komet, a ship in World War II
 KS-1 Komet, a Soviet anti-ship missile
 HMAS Una, a Royal Australian Navy sloop, formerly the German motor launch Komet

In transportation:
 Dornier Komet, a family of aircraft manufactured in Germany in the 1920s
 Komet (American automobile), made only in 1911
 Komet (German automobile), produced between 1922 and 1924
 Komet (train), a former overnight train service between Germany and Switzerland

In sports:
 SC Komet Berlin, a Berlin sports club from the late 1890s to the late 1930s
 TuS Komet Arsten, a German football club established in 2006
 Fort Wayne Komets, a minor league ice hockey team

In music:
 Komet, the tenth studio album by the German band Megaherz

People:
 Gürkan Coşkun (born 1941), a Turkish painter
 Frank Bretschneider (born 1956), a German electronic musician

See also:
 Comet (disambiguation)